Oleksandrivka Raion may refer to a former raion of Ukraine:

Oleksandrivka Raion, Donetsk Oblast, former raion in Donetsk Oblast
Oleksandrivka Raion, Kirovohrad Oblast, former raion in Kirovohrad Oblast

See also
Oleksandrivka
Velyka Oleksandrivka Raion, former raion in Kherson Oblast